The Vickers Company produced two aircraft with the name Valentia
A flying boat, see Vickers Valentia
A freighter and troop transport, see Vickers Type 264 Valentia